Goin' Latin is a studio jazz album with Latin percussion and style by Ramsey Lewis which was released on Cadet Records in 1967. The album reached number 2 and number 16 on the Billboard Black and Jazz Albums Charts.

Track listing

Side 1
"Hey, Mrs. Jones" 	                                (Marion Miller, Robert L. Reagan) 	                                        4:01 
"Summer Samba" 	                                        (Marcos Valle, Norman Gimbel, Paulo Sérgio Valle)                             	                        3:09 
"One, Two, Three" 	                                (David White, John Medora, Leonard Borisoff)	        3:26 
"Free Again" 	                                        (Joss Baselli, Armand Canfora, Robert Colby, Michel Jourdan)	                        2:56 
"Down by the Riverside" 	                                (Traditional; adapted by Esmond Edwards)                       	                        3:43

Side 2
"Blue Bongo" (Richard Evans) — 4:19 
"I'll Wait for You" (Richard Evans) — 3:17 
"Function at the Junction" (Edward Holland, Jr., Shorty Long, Lamont Dozier) — 3:04 
"Spanish Grease" (Willie Bobo, Melvin Lastie) — 3:11 
"Lara's Theme (Somewhere My Love)" [from Doctor Zhivago] (Maurice Jarre, Paul Francis Webster) — 2:36 
"Cast Your Fate to the Wind" (Vince Guaraldi) — 3:12

Charts

Personnel
Cleveland Eaton -   Bass 
Ramsey Lewis -	 Piano, Keyboards 
Maurice White -	 Drums
Doug Brand -	         Supervising Engineer 
Don Bronstein -	 Photography 
Brian Christian -	 Engineer 
Esmond Edwards	-        Producer, Adaptation, Supervisor 
Richard Evans -         Arranger 
Tom Gorman -	         Cover Design 
Hollis King -	         Art Direction 
Erick Labson -	         Mastering 
Andy McKaie -	         Reissue Supervisor 
Shigeo Miyamoto -	 Mastering 
Cameron Mizell -	 Production Coordination 
Isabelle Wong	  -      Design

References

Ramsey Lewis albums
Cadet Records albums
1967 albums
Albums produced by Esmond Edwards